Peter Derek Yates (born 1958), is a male former athlete who competed for England.

Athletics career
Yates represented England and won a bronze medal in the javelin, at the 1978 Commonwealth Games in Edmonton, Alberta, Canada. Four years later he represented England in the javelin, at the 1982 Commonwealth Games in Brisbane, Queensland, Australia.

He won the 1978 AAA National Championship title in the javelin.

References

1958 births
English male javelin throwers
Commonwealth Games medallists in athletics
Commonwealth Games bronze medallists for England
Athletes (track and field) at the 1978 Commonwealth Games
Living people
Medallists at the 1978 Commonwealth Games